Cherrywood is a stop on the Luas light-rail tram system in Dún Laoghaire - Rathdown, south of Dublin, Ireland. It opened in 2010 as a stop on the extension of the Green Line south from Sandyford to Brides Glen.

Location and access
The stop provides access to the Cherrywood development and its eponymous business park.  Cherrywood stop is located at the Northern end of a concrete viaduct over an empty plot of land. The sole entrance is to the road which crosses the tracks at the northern end of the stop.

References

Luas Green Line stops in Dún Laoghaire–Rathdown
Railway stations opened in 2010
2010 establishments in Ireland
Railway stations in the Republic of Ireland opened in the 21st century